The 1935 Wimbledon Championships took place on the outdoor grass courts at the All England Lawn Tennis and Croquet Club in Wimbledon, London, United Kingdom. The tournament was held from Monday 24 June until Saturday 6 July 1935.> It was the 55th staging of the Wimbledon Championships, and the third Grand Slam tennis event of 1935. Fred Perry and Helen Moody won the singles titles.

This was the final Wimbledon tournament during the reign of King George V.

Finals

Men's singles

 Fred Perry defeated  Gottfried von Cramm, 6–2, 6–4, 6–4

Women's singles

 Helen Moody defeated  Helen Jacobs, 6–3, 3–6, 7–5

Men's doubles

 Jack Crawford /  Adrian Quist defeated  Wilmer Allison /  John Van Ryn, 6–3, 5–7, 6–2, 5–7, 7–5

Women's doubles

 Freda James /  Kay Stammers defeated  Simonne Mathieu /  Hilde Sperling, 6–1, 6–4

Mixed doubles

 Fred Perry /  Dorothy Round defeated  Harry Hopman /  Nell Hopman, 7–5, 4–6, 6–2

References

External links
 Official Wimbledon Championships website

 
Wimbledon Championships
Wimbledon Championships
Wimbledon Championships
Wimbledon Championships